Kirsten Thomsen (born 2 November 1954) is a Danish rower. She competed in the women's quadruple sculls event at the 1976 Summer Olympics.

References

1954 births
Living people
Danish female rowers
Olympic rowers of Denmark
Rowers at the 1976 Summer Olympics
Rowers from Copenhagen